Malir Cantonment Railway Station is located at Malir Cantonment, Karachi, Pakistan.

See also
 List of railway stations in Pakistan
 Pakistan Railways

References

External links

Railway stations in Karachi
Railway stations on Karachi Circular Railway
Railway stations on Karachi–Peshawar Line (ML 1)